Plateau Mountain is located in the town of Hunter in Greene County, New York, United States. 
It is part of the Devil's Path range of the Catskill Mountains. 
Plateau has a two-mile-long summit ridge above .
The highest point, at least , is at the southeast end, facing Sugarloaf Mountain to the east across Mink Hollow Notch. It is the 12th-highest peak in the range
Devils Tombstone is located west of Plateau Mountain. The northwest end faces Hunter Mountain to the west across  Stony Clove Notch.

Plateau Mountain stands within the watershed of the Hudson River, which drains into New York Bay. 
It feeds the Hudson by way of Esopus Creek through Stony Clove Creek from its western slopes, and through Beaver Kill from its southeast end.
Its southwest slopes drain into Warner Creek, thence into Stony Clove Creek. 
The northeastern slopes of Plateau drain into Schoharie Creek, thence into the Mohawk River, and the Hudson River.

Plateau Mountain is within New York's Catskill State Park.
The Devil's Path hiking trail traverses the summit ridge of Plateau. 
The Long Path then follows the Devil's Path east to the slopes of Indian Head Mountain on the Catskill Escarpment.

See also 
 List of mountains in New York

References

External links 
  Summitpost.org: Plateau Mountain

Mountains of Greene County, New York
Catskill High Peaks
Mountains of New York (state)